European Distributed Energy Partnership (EU-DEEP) is a large research project supported by the European Union (EU) and coordinated by GDF Suez. Started in 2004, the project gathers 41 organizations around the common objective of removing the main barriers to massive deployment of distributed energy resources (DER).

Background
DER are small grid connecting devices that enable decentralized energy to be stored or generated close to the load they serve with the capacity of 10 megawatts (MW) or less. Centralized power plants use energy to transmit power over long distance, so decentralizing the system uses less energy and encompasses a wide variety of different advancing renewable technologies such as Wind power, Solar power, Geothermal power, Biomass, and Biogas into the system.

“European cities are the most advanced in terms of the transition to new energies”, Denis Simonneau, Head of International and European Relations at GDF SUEZ.

The EU-DEEP project, developed by eight different European energy companies, was designed so that  most of the technical and non-technical issues which halt a massive deployment of distributed energy resources (DER) in Europe could be eliminated.

Studies related to the project
To address the wide range of challenges associated with operating the electricity system of the future, the leading Transmission system operator (TSOs) and Distribution System Operators (DSOs), manufacturers and research establishments in the EU have formed a consortium of 18 partners to undertake a 4-year project code named FENIX whose overall aim is:
"To conceptualize, design and demonstrate a technical architecture and commercial framework that would enable DER based systems to become the solution
for the future cost efficient, secure and sustainable EU electricity supply system."

"The main concern is to provide answers to tackle the different types of barrier to DER deployment." There is three main types of barriers to the DER deployment which are technology barriers, market barriers, and regulatory barriers. Feem was one of the EU-DEEP partner that was responsible for developing Regulatory Models for the integration of DER. Focusing on FEEM's research, they had work on Demand Response. The main point of the work was to show "how to correlate price patterns to different generation technologies and validation of the three Business Models."

EU-DEEP Partners
The EU-DEEP is made up of forty-two partners from sixteen countries. The partners are different from one another as they include energy operators, industrial manufacturers, research centers, academics, professionals and national agencies. Each partner also has different capabilities from the development of electric equipments to the analysis of the energy markets mechanisms.

References

External links
 

Energy in the European Union
Distributed generation